Masawaih al-Mardini (Yahyā ibn Masawaih al-Mardini; known as Mesue the Younger) was a Assyrian physician. He was born in Mardin, Upper Mesopotamia. After working in Baghdad, he entered to the service of the Fatimid caliph Al-Hakim bi-Amr Allah. He died in 1015 in Cairo at the age of ninety.

Masawaih al-Mardini was a Nestorian Christian. He is known due to his books on purgatives and emetics (De medicins laxativis) and on the complete pharmacopoeia in 12 parts called the Antidotarium sive Grabadin medicamentorum, which remained for centuries the standard textbook of pharmacy in the West.

He also described methods of distillation of empyreumatic oils.  A method of extracting oil from "some kind of bituminous shale", one of the first descriptions of extraction of shale oil was described by him  in the 10th century.

References

Physicians from the Fatimid Caliphate
1015 deaths
11th-century physicians
Year of birth unknown
11th-century people from the Abbasid Caliphate
11th-century Egyptian people
11th-century people from the Fatimid Caliphate
Nestorians
Church of the East writers
Christians from the Fatimid Caliphate
Medieval Assyrian physicians